The 1849 Vermont gubernatorial election took place on September 4, 1849, and resulted in the reelection of Whig Party candidate Carlos Coolidge to another one-year term as governor.

Results

References

1849
Vermont
Gubernatorial
September 1849 events